Bijwasan railway station is a railway station in Bijwasan which is a residential and commercial neighborhood of South Delhi area of Delhi. Its code is BWSN. The station is part of  Delhi Suburban Railway. The station consists of two platforms. The platforms are not well sheltered.

See also
 Hazrat Nizamuddin railway station
 New Delhi railway station
 Delhi Junction railway station
 Anand Vihar Railway Terminal
 Sarai Rohilla railway station
 Delhi Metro

References 

Railway stations in South Delhi district
Delhi railway division